NA64 experiment is one of the several experiments at Super Proton Synchrotron (SPS) particle collider searching for dark sector particles. It is a fixed target experiment in which an electron beam of energy between 100-150 GeV, strikes fixed atomic nuclei. The primary goal of NA64 is to find unknown and hypothetical particles such as dark photons, axions, and axion-like particles.

Secondarily this experiment will also use the muon beams from the SPS with the goal of finding particles that mainly interact with muons and hence could give valuable insights into muon’s anomalous magnetic moment. Few other goals of NA64 include searching for invisible neutral kaon decays and meson decays, as well as the hunt of particles that could consist the mirror-type dark matter.

References

External Links 
 NA64 sets bounds on how much new X bosons could change the electron’s magnetism
 https://na64.web.cern.ch/node/10
NA64 explores gap in searches for axions and axion-like particles
NA64 casts light on dark photons
The plot thickens for a hypothetical “X17” particles

CERN experiments
CERN
Physics experiments
Fixed-target experiments